Zoochlorella is a nomen rejiciendum for a genus of green algae assigned to Chlorella. The term zoochlorella (plural zoochlorellae) is sometimes used to refer to any green algae that lives symbiotically within the body of a freshwater or marine invertebrate or protozoan. Zoochlorellae and zooxanthellae may both be found in the Pacific coast sea anemones Anthopleura elegantissima and Anthopleura xanthogrammica.

The analogy between Zoochlorella and chloroplasts has been used by the botanist Konstantin Mereschkowski in 1905 to argue about the symbiotic origin of chloroplasts (then called 'chromatophores', a term used for completely different structures today).

Zoochlorellae are responsible for the greenish colour of sea anemone tentacles.

Notes

References 

Chlorellaceae
Trebouxiophyceae genera
Monotypic algae genera